Kantorowicz or Kantrowitz is a surname. Notable people with the surname include:

Kantorowicz:
 Ernst Hartwig Kantorowicz, German historian, member of the George-Kreis (1895–1963)
 Hermann Kantorowicz, German jurist and civil lawyer (1877–1940)

Kantrowitz:
 Adrian Kantrowitz (1918–2008), American cardiac surgeon
 Arthur Kantrowitz (1913–2008), American scientist, engineer, and educator
 Melanie Kaye/Kantrowitz (1945–2018), American essayist, poet, activist and academic

German-language surnames